Sura is a 2010 Indian Tamil-language action comedy film written and directed by S. P. Rajkumar, starring Vijay in the titular role along with Tamannaah, Vadivelu, and Dev Gill in supporting roles. The film, produced by Sangili Murugan and distributed by Sun Pictures features film's soundtrack and score was composed by Mani Sharma. Cinematography was handled by M. S. Prabhu and N. K. Ekambaram respectively and editing was handled by Don Max. The film was the 50th film of Vijay.

The story revolves around a fisherman who fights against a cruel, greedy and corrupt minister in order to save the lands which is used to build homes for his fishermen hamlet. The rest of the film is about how Sura manages to build lands for his hamlet and destroy the plans of minister. The film, which commenced production in November 2009 in Kerala, was released worldwide on 30 April 2010. The film fared well in overseas box office has collected $897,597 but underperformed domestically. Producer Sangili Murugan reported to the media that the film Sura recovered only its budget in its film run. In 2020, Sura film was re-released in Kerala state.

In survey taken for week 45 (4-10 November 2017), Sony Max Hindi TV channel increased its viewership by 25% after Hindi dubbed film Sura telecast. The film became popular in Indonesia, and cited it as an Indian Aquaman.

Plot
Sura was born and brought up in YaazhNagar, a fisherman hamlet in coastal Tamil Nadu, in the company of his friend AmbarLa alias Umbrella. Meanwhile, he comes across young woman Poornima, who chooses to end her life, unable to cope up with the death of her pet dog Ramesh. Poornima is attracted to Sura, due to his good deeds and they fall for each other. Samuthira Raja / Sundaram is a cruel, greedy and corrupt minister, who wants to usurp Sura's hamlet to build a fair, but his attempts to usurp the hamlet are resisted by Sura. Sundaram hatches a conspiracy to bump off Sura with the help of his ministerial post and authority and sues him.

Sura takes them on single-handedly and destroys Sundaram's intention and helps his fishermen to regain their own houses. However, Sundaram is plotting revenge against Sura for usurping his money. He plants a bomb and Sundaram catches Sura. Sundaram reveals that he planted a bomb in Sura's hamlet. Sura tells that their hamlet's inauguration chief guest is actually Sundaram's wife, much to Sundaram's shock. Sundaram deactivates the bomb where he is killed by Sura, who Sundaram, thus rendering peace to the hamlet.

Cast

Production
After the completion of Vettaikaaran (2009), Vijay announced that his 50th film was to be named as Urimaikural named after M. G. Ramachandran starrer of same name but it was titled as Sura. Many directors were considered for the 50th film of Vijay: Selvaraghavan, S. P. Rajakumar, K. V. Anand, Dharani, Prabhu Deva, Siddique, Raja Mohan, R. Madhesh, K. S. Ravikumar and Perarasu. Perarasu was initially selected as director, but later opted out. S. P. Rajkumar, who directed Azhagar Malai (2009) was selected as director. Prior to this, S. P. Rajkumar previously worked in Vijay starrer Once More (1997) as a dialogue writer.

In May 2009, Tamannaah was confirmed to play a role in the film. Originally, Pasupathi was selected to portray the negative role but he was replaced by Dev Gill who appeared in Telugu film Magadheera (2009), after Vijay was impressed by his performance in that film.

The shooting of the film commenced in Kerala in November 2009 and was continued in different places in Tamil Nadu like Marakkanam, Villupuram, Mamallapuram, Chennai, Alleppey, and Pondicherry. The shoot continued on 21 October and canned a few stunt sequences on the Uppaneri Bridge near Marakkanam Salt Lake. Vijay fought with villain Dev's gang for almost three days. After a three-day gap, the shoot resumed in Prasad Studios and the song "Thanjavur Jillakari" was shot at AVM Studio on 27 October. The unit created a slum set at East Coast Road. A song was shot at Ooty. During the shooting, cameraman M. S. Prabhu and Rajakumar had a misunderstanding and he was replaced by N. K. Ekhambharam. Ekambaram reveals that one of the fight sequences, which were shot in the high seas in Tuticorin at 2 am, was choreographed by Kanal Kannan and has stuntmen from Bangkok. Ekambaram says that he has used high speed cameras considering the risks involved in shooting in the seas. The opening song has been pictured in a scenic location in Dhanushkodi.

Soundtrack

The soundtrack of the film, composed by Mani Sharma, was released on 29 March 2010 at Lady Aandal Venkat Subbarao School. The prominent guest list includes Sundar C, Sibiraj, Riyaz Khan and Uma Riyaz Khan, Ramanarayanan, K S Ravikumar, Parthiban, Vadivelu, Sonia Agarwal, Srikanth along with the lead stars of the film and the technical crew. Kabilan reveals that lyrics for all songs from the film were written even before Vettaikaran was released. The album features six songs all of which have been reused from his previous films. "Vetri Kodi Yethu", "Vanga Kadal Ellai", "Siragadikkum Nilavu", "Thamizhan Veera Thamizhan", "Thanjavoor Jillakkari", and "Naan Nadanthal Athiradi" are based on the Telugu songs "Inthe Inthinthe", "Nuvvasalu", "Tagilinadi Rabba", "Hut Hutja", "Bommali"  and "My Name Is Billa", respectively.

Release
The film's release was originally slated to 23 April 2010, but was eventually postponed and released on 30 April 2010. It was also released in Hindi under the same title by Goldmines Telefilms in 2017.

Critical reception
Behindwoods gave it two and a half stars, declaring it "Sura is a usual Vijay fare ." The entertainment site Sify wrote that Sura proved that "conviction can bring any formula to life". Rediff gave 2 out of 5 stars and stated that "Give your brains a rest, and enjoy this mass masala entertainer". Ananda Vikatan rated the film 37 out of 100.

References

External links
 
 

2010 films
2010s Tamil-language films
Films scored by Mani Sharma
Films shot in Alappuzha
Films shot in Chennai
Films shot in Puducherry
Indian action films
2010 masala films
Films directed by S. P. Rajkumar
2010 action films